Sophia is an academic journal devoted to professional pursuits in philosophy, metaphysics, religion and moral thinking, founded in 1962 by Max Charlesworth and Graeme de Graaf. From 2001 Sophia was published by Ashgate Publishing in collaboration with the Australasian Society for Philosophy of Religion and Theology, Australasian Association of Philosophy, Australasian Society for Asian and Comparative Philosophy, The University of Melbourne and Deakin University. The journal has since moved to Springer in Dordrecht-Berlin, with its editorial office split between The University of Melbourne (School of Historical and Philosophical Studies; Hells Logicians) in Australia, Singapore (Philosophy, National University of Singapore), and both coasts of the United States (University of California and Harvard University). The Editors-in-Chief are Purushottama Bilimoria, Saranindranath Tagore, & Patrick Hutchings.

External links 

 
 

Philosophy journals
Religious studies journals
Publications established in 1962
Springer Science+Business Media academic journals